USNS John McDonnell (T-AGS-51) was a hydrographic survey ship operated by the Military Sealift Command (MSC) with a contract crew for the Naval Oceanographic Office which assigned a military and civilian hydrographic detachment to conduct coastal surveys.

The keel was laid by Halter Marine, Inc. of Moss Point, Mississippi on 3 August 1989. Launch took place on 13 December 1990 with the wife of the ship's namesake, Mrs. Mary McDonnell, as sponsor. On 15 November 1991 John McDonnell was placed in service with MSC.

The new vessels were about half the length of those large survey ships with two rather than four survey launches. Contract crew size was 24 instead of 70 for the larger ships and the military and Naval Oceanographic Office civilian hydrographic detachment could be decreased from 80 to 10. The ships were equipped only for coastal survey operations and unlike the larger Pathfinder class vessels were not capable of both coastal and deep ocean surveys.

The vessels conducted hydrographic surveys in domestic waters in support of Navy missions and in international and foreign waters in support of the Mapping, Charting, and Geodesy (MC&G) requirements of the National Geospatial-Intelligence Agency and its predecessor organization the Defense Mapping Agency. Those MC&G requirements support all military operations and also civilian mariners with products outside the U.S. territorial waters that are the charting responsibility of NOAA.

After the Indian Ocean Tsunami the coastal survey ship along with the larger  were deployed from Sasebo, Japan to survey the area where the 9.0 magnitude earthquake occurred.

The John McDonnell aided in the location of two downed F-16s in the Northern Persian Gulf in 1993 and the wreckage of a Navy helicopter in the Strait of Hormuz in 1994. Two years later, it located a crashed F-14 in the Central Persian Gulf. In 2008, the vessel helped locate a Philippine Air Force (PAF) C-130 Hercules that crashed in Davao Gulf.

The Navy deactivated and struck the ship 16 August 2010 and delivered the ship to the Navy Inactive Ships Program, Pearl Harbor, Hawaii 25 August. As of August 2013, the General Services Administration was offering the ship at auction.

As of June 2016, the overhauled and re-christened Seafreeze America is currently owned and operated by United States Seafoods, LLC and serves as a fishing trawler in the Bering Sea sector.

References

External links
 USNS John McDonnell (TAGS 51) Oceanographic Survey Ships - T-AGS
 TAGS 51 John McDonnell Globalsecurity.org
 McDonnell crew members aid attack victim SeaLift Military Command
 USNS John McDonnell Photo Archive NavSource Online: Service Ship Photo Archive
 Oceanographic survey ship USNS John McDonnell is deactivated

1990 ships
Ships built in Moss Point, Mississippi
Survey ships of the United States Navy